The 1973–74 Coupe de France was the 57th Coupe de France, France's annual national football cup competition. It was won by AS Saint-Étienne, who defeated AS Monaco FC in the final.

Round of 16

Quarter-finals

Semi-finals

Final

References

French federation

1973–74 domestic association football cups
1973–74 in French football
1973-74